A propfan, also called an open rotor engine, or unducted fan (as opposed to a ducted fan), is a type of aircraft engine related in concept to both the turboprop and turbofan, but distinct from both. The design is intended to offer the speed and performance of a turbofan, with the fuel economy of a turboprop. A propfan is typically designed with a large number of short, highly twisted blades, similar to the (ducted) fan in a turbofan engine. For this reason, the propfan has been variously described as an "unducted fan" (UDF) or an "ultra-high-bypass (UHB) turbofan."

Definition 

In the 1970s, Hamilton Standard described its propfan as "a small diameter, highly loaded multiple bladed variable pitch propulsor having swept blades with thin advanced airfoil sections, integrated with a nacelle contoured to retard the airflow through the blades thereby reducing compressibility losses and designed to operate with a turbine engine and using a single stage reduction gear resulting in high performance."

In 1986, British engine maker Rolls-Royce used the term open rotor as a synonym for the original meaning of a propfan. This action was to delineate the propfan engine type from a number of ducted engine proposals at the time that had propfan in their names. By the 2000s, open rotor (OR) became a preferred term for propfan technology in research and news reports, with contra-rotating open rotor (CROR) also occasionally being used to distinguish between single-rotation propfans. As of 2015, the European Aviation Safety Agency (EASA) defined an open rotor concretely (but broadly) as "a turbine engine fan stage that is not enclosed within a casing;" in contrast, it had only a working definition of an open rotor engine (the more commonly used term for propfan in the 21st century), calling it "a turbine engine featuring contra-rotating fan stages not enclosed within a casing." The engine uses a gas turbine to drive an unshrouded (open) contra-rotating propeller like a turboprop, but the design of the propeller itself is more tightly coupled to the turbine design, and the two are certified as a single unit.

El-Sayed differentiates between turboprops and propfans according to 11 different criteria, including number of blades, blade shape, tip speed, bypass ratio, Mach number, and cruise altitude.

History 

About a decade after German aerospace engineers began exploring the idea of using swept wings to reduce drag on transonic speed aircraft, Hamilton Standard in the 1940s attempted to apply a similar concept to engine propellers. It created highly swept propeller blades with supersonic tip speeds, so that engines with exposed propellers could power aircraft to speeds and cruising altitudes only attained by new turbojet and turbofan engines. Early tests of these blades revealed then-unresolvable blade flutter and blade stress problems, and high noise levels were considered another obstacle. The term propfan was created during this period.

One of the earliest engines that resembled the propfan concept was the  Metrovick F.5, which featured twin contra-rotating fans—14 blades in the fore (front) fan and 12 blades in the aft (back) fan—at the rear of the engine and was first run in 1946. The blades, however, were mostly unswept. Other contra-rotating propeller engines that featured on common aircraft included the four powerful Kuznetsov NK-12 engines (each powering its own set of coaxial contra-rotating propellers) on the Soviet Union's Tupolev Tu-95 high-speed military bomber and Antonov An-22 military transport aircraft, and the Armstrong Siddeley Double Mamba (ASMD) engines (both connected to a lone set of coaxial contra-rotating propellers) on the British Fairey Gannet anti-submarine aircraft. Both setups had four largely unswept blades in the front propeller and the back propeller.

1970s–1980s 

When the 1973 oil crisis caused petroleum price spikes in the early 1970s, interest in propfans soared, and NASA-funded research began to accelerate. The propfan concept was outlined by Carl Rohrbach and Bruce Metzger of the Hamilton Standard division of United Technologies in 1975 and was patented by Rohrbach and Robert Cornell of Hamilton Standard in 1979. Later work by General Electric on similar propulsors adopted the name unducted fan, which was a modified turbofan engine, with the fan placed outside the engine nacelle on the same axis as the compressor blades.

During this era, the propeller problems became fixable. Advances were made in structural materials, such as titanium metal and graphite and glass fiber composites infused with resin. These materials replaced aluminum and steel metals in blade construction, which allowed the blades to be made thinner and stronger. Computer-aided design was also useful in refining blade characteristics. Since the blades bend and deflect with higher power loading and centrifugal force, the initial designs needed to be based on the in-motion shape. With the help of computers, the blade designers would then work backward to find the optimal unloaded shape for manufacturing purposes.

Flight test programs 

Hamilton Standard, the only large American manufacturer of aircraft propellers, developed the propfan concept in the early 1970s. Hamilton Standard tested numerous variations in conjunction with NASA.

Under the Propfan Test Assessment (PTA) program, Lockheed-Georgia proposed modifying a Gulfstream II to act as in-flight testbed for the propfan concept, while McDonnell Douglas proposed modifying a DC-9 for the same purpose. NASA chose the Lockheed proposal. The Gulfstream II had a nacelle added to the left wing, containing a  Allison 570 turboprop engine (derived from the XT701 turboshaft developed for the Boeing Vertol XCH-62 heavy lift helicopter). The engine used an eight-bladed, single-rotation Hamilton Standard SR-7 propfan. It was first operated in flight on March 28, 1987. The extensive test program, which cost about $56 million, racked up 73 flights and over 133 hours of flight time before finishing on March 25, 1988. In 1989, however, the testbed aircraft returned to the air from April 3 through April 14 to measure ground noise levels during flight. The engine was removed after that, and the aircraft was converted to a space shuttle training aircraft later that year.

The GE36 Unducted Fan (UDF), from American engine maker General Electric (GE) with 35-percent participation from French partner Snecma (now Safran), was a variation on the original propfan concept and resembled a pusher configuration piston engine. GE's UDF had a novel direct-drive arrangement, where the reduction gearbox was replaced by a low-speed seven-stage free turbine. One set of turbine rotors drove the forward set of propellers, while the rear set was driven by the other set of rotors which rotated in the opposite direction. The turbine had 14 blade rows with seven stages. Each stage was a pair of contra-rotating rows. Airframers, who had been wary of issue-prone gearboxes since the 1950s, liked GE's gearless version of the propfan: Boeing intended to offer GE's pusher UDF engine on the 7J7 platform (which would have had a cruise speed of Mach 0.83), and McDonnell Douglas planned to do likewise on their MD-94X airliner. The GE36 was first flight tested mounted on the #3 engine station of a Boeing 727-100 on August 20, 1986.

McDonnell Douglas developed a proof-of-concept aircraft by modifying its company-owned MD-80, which is suited for propfans due to its aft fuselage-mounted engines (like its DC-9 ancestor), in preparation for the possible propfan-powered MD-91 and MD-92 derivatives and a possible MD-94X clean-sheet aircraft. They replaced the left side JT8D turbofan engine with the GE36. Test flights began in May 1987, which proved the design's airworthiness, aerodynamic characteristics, and noise signature. Following the initial tests, a first-class cabin was installed inside the aft fuselage and airline executives were offered the opportunity to experience the UDF-powered aircraft first-hand. The test and marketing flights of the GE-outfitted demonstrator aircraft concluded in 1988, exhibiting a 30% reduction in fuel consumption over turbo-fan powered MD-80, full Stage 3 noise compliance, and low levels of interior noise/vibration. The GE36 would have the same  thrust on the MD-92X, but the same engine would be derated to  thrust for the smaller MD-91X. The MD-80 was also successfully flight tested in April 1989 with the 578-DX propfan, which was a prototype from the Allison Engine Company (at that time a division of General Motors) that was also derived from the Allison XT701 and built with Hamilton Standard propellers. The engine program was jointly developed between Allison and another division of United Technologies, the engine maker Pratt & Whitney. Unlike the competing GE36 UDF, the 578-DX was fairly conventional, having a reduction gearbox between the LP turbine and the propfan blades. Due to jet fuel price drops and shifting marketing priorities, Douglas shelved the propfan program later that year.

Other proposed applications 
Other announcements of future propfan-powered airliners included:

 The Fokker FXX, a 100-120 seat propfan-powered aircraft that was studied in 1982
 The Ilyushin Il-88, a successor to the four-turboprop Antonov An-12 tactical transporter that would be powered by two  Progress D-236 propfans
 The Ilyushin Il-118, an upgrade to the four-turboprop Ilyushin Il-18 airliner; proposed in 1984, the aircraft would instead be powered by two D-236 propfans, with the eight-bladed front propeller on each engine rotating at a speed of 1,100 rpm and the six-bladed back propeller turning at 1,000 rpm to lower noise and vibration
 A re-engined Antonov An-124, replacing the four Progress D-18T turbofans by  Kuznetsov NK-62 propfans

Decline 

None of these projects came to fruition, however, mainly because of excessive cabin noise (compared to turbofans) and low fuel prices. For General Electric, the GE36 UDF was meant to replace the CFM56 high-bypass turbofan that it produced with equal partner Snecma in their CFM International joint venture. In the 1980s the engine was initially uncompetitive against the International Aero Engines rival offering, the IAE V2500. In December 1986, the chairman of Snecma declared that the in-development CFM56-5S2 would be the last turbofan created for the CFM56 family, and that "There is no point in spending more money on turbofans. UDF is the future." The V2500 ran into technical problems in 1987, however, and the CFM56 gained major sales momentum. General Electric lost interest in having the GE36 cannibalize the CFM56, which went five years before it received its first order in 1979, and while "the UDF could be made reliable by earlier standards, turbofans were getting much, much better than that." General Electric added the UDF's blade technology directly into the GE90, the most powerful jet engine ever produced, for the Boeing 777.

1990s 

At the beginning of the 1990s, the Soviet Union/Russia performed flight tests on the Progress D-236, a geared contra-rotating propfan engine based on the core of the Progress D-36 turbofan, with eight blades on the front propeller and six blades on the back propeller. One testbed was a  propfan mounted to an Ilyushin Il-76 and flown to the Hannover ILA 90 airshow, which was intended for an unidentified four-propfan aircraft. The D-236 flew 36 times for a total of 70 flight test hours on the Il-76. The Soviets claimed the D-236 had a true aerodynamic efficiency of 28 percent and a fuel savings of 30 percent over an equivalent turboprop.

Like the Progress D-236, the more powerful Progress D-27 propfan engine is a contra-rotating propfan with eight front blades and six back blades, but the D-27 has advanced composite blades with a reduced thickness-to-chord ratio and a more pronounced curvature at the leading edge. Two rear-mounted D-27 propfans propelled the Ukrainian Antonov An-180, which was scheduled for a 1995 first flight and a 1997 entry into service. In January 1994, Antonov rolled out the first prototype of the An-70 military transport aircraft, powered by four Progress D-27s attached to wings mounted to the top of the fuselage. The Russian Air Force placed an order for 164 aircraft in 2003, later canceled. As of 2013, the An-70 was still thought to have a promising future as a freighter. However, since the propeller component of the Progress D-27 is made by Russia's SPE Aerosila, the An-70 was stymied by Ukraine's political conflict with Russia. Instead, Antonov began working with Turkey in 2018 to redevelop the An-70 as a rebranded An-77, so that the aircraft can comply with modern-day requirements without Russian supplier participation.

Twenty-first century 
In the first decade of the 21st century, rising jet fuel prices increased emphasis on engine/airframe efficiency to reduce emissions, which renewed interest in the propfan concept for jetliners beyond the Boeing 787 and Airbus A350XWB. For instance, Airbus patented aircraft designs with twin rear-mounted contra-rotating propfans. It became lukewarm on propfan technology in the 1980salthough it developed an open rotor design that was thought to be a finalist for the Irkut MS-21 narrowbody aircraft.

The European Commission launched an Open Rotor demonstration in 2008 led by Safran within the Clean Sky program funded with 65 million euros over eight years. A demonstrator was assembled in 2015, and ground tested in May 2017 on its open-air test rig in Istres, aiming to reduce fuel consumption and associated CO2 emissions by 30% compared with current CFM56 turbofans. After the completion of ground testing at the end of 2017, Safran's geared open rotor engine had reached technology readiness level 5. Safran's future open rotor engine, however, would have a maximum diameter of almost .

In 2007, the Progress D-27 was successfully modified to meet the United States Federal Aviation Administration (FAA) Stage 4 regulations, which correspond to International Civil Aviation Organization (ICAO) Chapter 4 standards. A 2012 trade study projected that propfan noise would be 10–13 decibels quieter than allowed by Stage 4 regulations. Stage 5 noise limits reduce the limits by only seven effective perceived noise decibels (EPNdB), within the propfan noise envelope. The study also projected that open rotors would be nine percent more fuel-efficient but remain 10–12 decibels louder than turbofans. Snecma claimed that its propfan engines would have about the same noise levels as its CFM LEAP turbofan engine.

In 2021, CFM International announced its Revolutionary Innovation for Sustainable Engines (RISE) development program to produce a single-stage, gear-driven propfan paired with active stators in a puller/tractor, configuration with flight tests to begin by 2025. The rotor was expected to be  in diameter. The engine was expected to produce  of thrust, with a 20% increase in fuel efficiency. The company claimed its motivation was the global emphasis on reducing emissions. The engine was planned to support both hydrogen and sustainable aviation fuels. The engine was expected to include a compact high-pressure core and a recuperating system to preheat combustion air with exhaust heat along with ceramic matrix composites in the hot section and resin-transfer-molded composite fan blades. In addition to the rotor, the design includes a nonrotating set of variable-pitch stator blades that act as flow recovery vanes. The design increases the fan-pressure ratio and reduces rotor loading, increasing airspeed. The fan stage is to be powered by a high-speed booster compressor and a high-speed, low-pressure-shaft-driven front gearbox. The engine is slated for certification as an "integrated engine" instead of a traditional "propeller/engine" because of its airframe integration complexity. CFM planned for an aerodynamically three-dimensional rotor with 12 woven carbon-fiber composite blades. Aided by a smaller engine core, the CFM RISE engine would have a bypass ratio of 75.

Challenges

Blade design 
This powerful drag has a sudden onset, and it led to the concept of a sound barrier when first encountered in the 1940s. This effect can happen whenever the propeller is spun fast enough that the blade tips approach the speed of sound.

The most effective way to address this problem is by adding blades to the propeller, allowing it to deliver more power at a lower rotational speed. This is why many World War II fighter designs started with two or three-blade propellers but by the end of the war were using up to five blades; as the engines were upgraded, new propellers were needed to more efficiently convert that power. Adding blades makes the propeller harder to balance and maintain, and the additional blades cause minor performance penalties due to drag and efficiency issues. But even with these sorts of measures, eventually the forward speed of the plane combined with the rotational speed of the propeller blade tips (together known as the helical tip speed) will again result in wave drag problems.

A method of decreasing wave drag was discovered by German researchers in 1935—sweeping the wing backwards. Today, almost all aircraft designed to fly much above  use a swept wing. Since the inside of the propeller is moving slower in the rotational direction than the outside, the blade is progressively more swept back toward the outside, leading to a curved shape similar to a scimitar - a practice that was first used as far back as 1909, in the Chauvière two-bladed wood propeller used on the Blériot XI. (At the blade root, the blade is actually swept forward into the rotational direction, to counter the twisting that is generated by the backward swept blade tips.) The Hamilton Standard test propfan was swept progressively to a 39-degree maximum at the blade tips, allowing the propfan to produce thrust even though the blades had a helical tip speed of about Mach 1.15.

That maximum blade tip speed would be kept constant despite wider or narrower propeller diameter (resulting in an RPM reduction or increase, respectively).

Drag can also be reduced by making the blades thinner, which increases the speed that the blades can attain before the air ahead of them becomes compressible and causes shock waves. For example, the blades of the Hamilton Standard test propfan had a thickness-to-chord ratio that tapered from less than 20% at the spinner junction to 2% at the tips, and 4% at mid-span. (The GE36 UDF engine that was tested on the Boeing 727 had front and back blades that weighed  each.)

Noise 

One of the major problems with the propfan is noise. The propfan research in the 1980s discovered ways to reduce noise, but at the cost of reduced fuel efficiency, mitigating some of the advantages of a propfan.

General methods for reducing noise include lowering tip speeds and decreasing blade loading, or the amount of thrust per unit of blade surface area. A concept similar to wing loading, blade loading can be reduced by lowering the thrust requirement or by increasing the amount, width, and/or length of the blades. For contra-rotating propfans, which can be louder than turboprops or single-rotating propfans, noise can also be lowered by:
 increasing the gap between the propellers;
 keeping back propeller blade lengths shorter than those of the front propeller, so that the back propeller blades avoid cutting through the blade tip vortices of the front propeller (blade-vortex interaction);
 using different numbers of blades on the two propellers, to avoid acoustic reinforcement; and
 turning the front propeller and back propeller at different speeds, also to prevent acoustic reinforcement.

Community noise 

Engine makers expect propfan implementations to meet community (as opposed to cabin) noise regulations without sacrificing the efficiency advantage. Some think that propfans can potentially cause less of a community impact than turbofans, given their lower rotational speeds. Geared propfans should have an advantage over ungeared propfans for the same reason.

In 2007, the Progress D-27 was successfully modified to meet the United States Federal Aviation Administration (FAA) Stage 4 regulations, which correspond to International Civil Aviation Organization (ICAO) Chapter 4 standards and were adopted in 2006. A 2012 trade study projected that noise from existing open rotor technology would be 10–13 decibels quieter than the maximum noise level allowed by the Stage 4 regulations; the newer Stage 5 noise limits (which replaced the Stage 4 regulations for larger aircraft in 2018 and mirrored the ICAO Chapter 14 noise standard established in 2014) are more restrictive than the Stage 4 requirement by only seven effective perceived noise decibels (EPNdB), so current propfan technology shouldn't be hindered by the Stage 5 standards. The study also projected that at existing technology levels, open rotors would be nine percent more fuel-efficient but remain 10–12 decibels louder than turbofans. Snecma, however, maintains that open-rotor tests show that its propfan engines would have about the same noise levels as its CFM LEAP turbofan engine, which entered service in 2016.

Further reductions can be achieved by redesigning the aircraft structure to shield noise from the ground. For example, another study estimated that if propfan engines were used to power a hybrid wing body aircraft instead of a conventional tube-and-wing aircraft, noise levels could be reduced by as much as 38 EPNdB compared to ICAO Chapter 4 requirements. In 2007, the British budget airline easyJet introduced its ecoJet concept, a 150-250 seat aircraft with V-mounted open rotor engines joined to the rear fuselage and shielded by a U-tail. It unsuccessfully initiated discussions with Airbus, Boeing, and Rolls-Royce to produce the aircraft.

Size 

These sizes achieve the desired high bypass ratios of over 30, but they are approximately twice the diameter of turbofan engines of equivalent capability. For this reason, airframers usually design the empennage with a T-tail configuration for aerodynamic purposes, and the propfans may be attached to the upper part of the rear fuselage. If the propfans are mounted to the wings, the wings would be attached to the aircraft in a high wing configuration, which allows for ground clearance without requiring excessively long landing gear. For the same amount of power or thrust produced, an unducted fan requires shorter blades than a geared propfan, although the overall installation issues still apply.

Output rating 

Turboprops and most propfans are rated by the amount of shaft horsepower (shp) that they produce, as opposed to turbofans and the UDF propfan type, which are rated by the amount of thrust they put out. The rule of thumb is that at sea level with a static engine,  is roughly equivalent of  thrust, but at cruise altitude, that changes to about  thrust. That means two  engines can theoretically be replaced with a pair of  propfans or with two  UDF propfans.

Aircraft with propfans

Proposed aircraft with propfans

See also

References

General resources
Prop fan propulsion concepts: Technology Review, Design Methodology, State-of-the-art designs and future outlook. Raymond Scott Ciszek. University of Virginia Department of Mechanical and Aerospace Engineering. Senior Thesis Project. March 25, 2002

Bibliography

 
  alternate url
 
 
 
  alternate url
 
 
 
 
 
  alternate url
  alternate url
 
 
  alternate url
  alternate url
 
  alternate url
  alternate url
  alternate url
 
 
 
  alternate url
 
 
  alternate url

External links

 
 
 
 
 
 

Propfan engines

ru:Винтовентиляторный двигатель